Sabine Appelmans was the defending champion but lost in the quarterfinals to Beate Reinstadler.

Jana Novotná won in the final 6–7, 6–3, 6–4 against Barbara Rittner.

Seeds
A champion seed is indicated in bold text while text in italics indicates the round in which that seed was eliminated.

  Jana Novotná (champion)
  Iva Majoli (second round)
 n/a
  Karina Habšudová (second round)
  Nathalie Tauziat (first round)
  Sandra Cecchini (quarterfinals)
  Sabine Appelmans (quarterfinals)
  Meredith McGrath (second round)

Draw

External links
 1995 EA-Generali Ladies Linz draw

1995 WTA Tour